The Stele of Vespasian is a stele with Ancient Greek inscriptions found in 1867 at Armazi, near Mtskheta, Georgia in the ancient capital of the Caucasian Kingdom of Iberia. The stele memorialises reinforcement of fortification of Armazi walls by Emperor Vespasian. Additionally, the inscription mentions two emperors Titus, Domitian and two kings Mihrdat I of Iberia, Pharasmanes I of Iberia and prince royal Amazaspus. The inscription is dated 75 AD. The top of the stele is lost. According to Professor David Braund the missing text was in Latin or Armazic (outgrowth of Aramaic language). Cyril Toumanoff identifies Amazaspus as King Amazasp I of Iberia, though it can be prince royal Amazaspus, son of Pharasmanes I of Iberia, who is known from the Epigram of Amazaspos found in Rome.

Inscription

References

Bibliography
Stephen H. Rapp Jr (2014) The Sasanian World through Georgian Eyes: Caucasia and the Iranian Commonwealth in Late Antique Georgian Literature
Ronald Grigor Suny (1994) The Making of the Georgian Nation, Indiana University Press
Cyril Toumanoff (1969) Chronology of the Early Kings of Iberia, Fordham University
Giorgi Lomtatidze (1955) Archaeological excavations in an ancient Georgian capital of Mtskheta, Georgian National Academy of Sciences
Gela Gamkrelidze (2014) Archaeology of Roman period of Georgia

Archaeological artifacts
Roman-era Greek inscriptions
Pharnavazid dynasty
Building projects of the Flavian dynasty
Vespasian
1st-century artifacts
1st-century inscriptions
1867 archaeological discoveries
75 establishments